State Highway 14 (SH 14) is a State Highway in Kerala that starts from 
Erattupetta and ends at Pattithanam junction.

Route description 
Erattupetta -Teekoy- Vellikulam - Vagamon  - Road joins with Pullikkanam Elappara road - Pattithanam junction

See also 
Roads in Kerala
List of State Highways in Kerala

References 

State Highways in Kerala
Roads in Kottayam district
Roads in Idukki district